Pelvic limb may refer to:

 Lower limb, in human anatomy
 Hindlimb, in animal anatomy

See also
 Thoracic limb (disambiguation)